Brett French (born 27 March 1962) is an Australian former rugby league footballer who played in the 1980s. A Queensland State of Origin representative, he played club football in Brisbane, Sydney and the Gold Coast, plus in England for St Helens R.F.C. He is also the brother of fellow Queensland Maroon Ian French.

Brett French scored the match-winning try for Wynnum-Manly in the 1982 Brisbane Rugby League premiership's grand final victory over Souths.

References

External links
Brett French at stateoforigin.com.au

Australian rugby league players
1962 births
Wynnum Manly Seagulls players
St Helens R.F.C. players
Queensland Rugby League State of Origin players
North Sydney Bears players
Gold Coast Chargers players
Living people